The National Basketball League (NBL) is the premier professional men's basketball league in Australia and New Zealand. It was established in 1979. Andrew Gaze is widely considered one of the league's greatest players and features heavily in these records. Since its inaugural season he has had seven of the top ten seasons for average points scored. Gaze is also the league's highest career point scorer with 18,908. Statistics have been kept for both individuals and teams since its inception.

Points

Highest Scoring Averages – Season
 44.1 Andrew Gaze (20 games - 1987)
 39.5 Al Green (21 games - 1984)
 38.8 Andrew Gaze (28 games - 1991)
 37.6 Andrew Gaze (22 games - 1990)
 36.9 Andrew Gaze (24 games - 1988)
 36.9 Andrew Gaze (25 games - 1986)
 35.4 Paul Stanley (26 games - 1987)
 34.5 Andrew Gaze (27 games - 1989)
 33.9 Wayne McDaniel (25 games - 1990)
 33.9 Andrew Gaze (29 games - 1995)

Highest Scoring Averages – Career
Minimum of 60 games:
 32.6 Paul Stanley (69 games)
 30.9 Andrew Gaze (612 games)
 29.3 Bobby Locke (73 games)
 28.7 Michael Jones (70 games)
 28.7 Jerry Everett (85 games)
 28.2 Vince Kelley (77 games)
 27.7 Norman Taylor (67 games)
 27.6 Ken Epperson (76 games)
 26.9 Jason Reese (106 games)
 26.8 James Bullock (76 games)

Most Individual Points – Career
 18,908 Andrew Gaze
 13,106 Leroy Loggins
 11,121 James Crawford
 10,735 Lanard Copeland
 10,154 Tony Ronaldson
 9,621 Mark Bradtke
 9,379 Derek Rucker
 9,225 Scott Fisher
 9,080 Robert Rose
 9,065 Shane Heal

Most Points in a Game – Individual
 71 Al Green (West Adelaide) vs Frankston 25/05/84
 63 Reg Biddings (Forrestville) vs Bankstown 12/04/81
 61 Shane Heal (Brisbane) vs Townsville 23/09/94
 60 Al Green (West Adelaide) vs Sydney 05/05/84
 60 Andrew Gaze (Melbourne) vs Newcastle 11/07/87
 59 Al Green (West Adelaide) vs Coburg 19/05/84
 59 Andrew Gaze (Melbourne) vs Illawarra 27/07/91
 58 Andrew Gaze (Melbourne) vs Newcastle 20/09/86
 57 James Crawford (Perth) vs Melbourne 06/09/87
 57 Wayne McDaniel (Hobart) vs Adelaide 18/08/89

Most Points in a Game – Team
 186 Melbourne vs Wollongong 1991
 170 Brisbane vs Wollongong 1989
 165 Nth Melbourne vs Perth 1989
 164 Nth Melbourne vs Newcastle 1987
 160 Coburg vs Frankston 1984
 160 Adelaide vs Hobart 1984
 160 SE Melbourne vs Townsville 1994
 160 Nth Melbourne vs Hobart 1990
 159 Geelong vs Hobart 1984
 158 Wollongong vs Melbourne 1991

Fewest Points in a Game – Team
 40 Devonport vs Hobart 1983
 43 Cairns vs Townsville 2012
 47 Wollongong vs Perth 2013
 47 Sydney vs Melbourne 2021
 48 Sydney vs Cairns 2010
 49 Cairns vs Gold Coast 2012
 50 Wollongong vs Gold Coast 2012
 51 Townsville vs Cairns 2010
 52 Illawarra vs New Zealand 2020
 55 Canberra vs Sth East Melb 1997
 55 Townsville vs Perth 2012
 55 Sydney vs Perth 2014

Most Points (Grand Final) – Team
 125 Adelaide vs West Sydney 2002 – Game 3
 122 Adelaide vs Brisbane 1986 – Game 1 (OT)
 121 Brisbane vs Adelaide 1985
 120 Canberra vs North Melbourne 1988 – Game 1
 119 Brisbane vs Adelaide 1986 – Game 1 (OT)
 117 North Melbourne vs Canberra 1988 – Game 2
 117 Melbourne vs Perth 1993 – Game 1
 117 North Melbourne vs Adelaide 1994 – Game 2
 117 Sydney vs Perth 2003 – Game 2
 116 Melbourne vs SE Melbourne 1992 – Game 1

Fewest Points (Grand Final) – Team
 52 New Zealand vs Perth 2016 – Game 3
 53 Cairns vs New Zealand 2011 – Game 3
 54 Nunawading vs Launceston 1981
 59 Adelaide vs Perth 2014 – Game 3
 62 SE Melbourne vs Adelaide 1998 – Game 2
 63 Perth vs Wollongong 2010 – Game 2
 66 Perth vs New Zealand 2013 – Game 2
 67 Melbourne vs Souths 2009 – Game 3
 67 Perth vs New Zealand 2013 – Game 1
 68 Perth vs New Zealand 2016 – Game 2

40+ Point Games – Career
 101 Andrew Gaze
 23 Leroy Loggins
 22 Wayne McDaniel
 20 Derek Rucker
 18 Al Green
 16 Scott Fisher
 13 James Crawford
 13 Paul Stanley
 12 Michael Johnson

30+ Points Per Game – Seasons
 15 Andrew Gaze
 4 Wayne McDaniel
 3 Al Green
 3 Scott Fisher
 2 Michael Jones
 2 Benny Lewis
 2 Bobby Locke
 2 Derek Rucker
 2 Paul Stanley
 2 Tim Dillon

Games

Most Games Played – Individual
 665 Tony Ronaldson
 612 Andrew Gaze
 567 Leroy Loggins
 563 Glen Saville
 554 Mark Bradtke
 532 Lanard Copeland
 525 Brett Maher
 524 Mat Campbell
 518 Ray Borner
 516 C. J. Bruton

Rebounds

Most Rebounds – Individual
 34 Dean Uthoff vs Hobart 1984
 34 Kendal Pinder vs Bankstown 1985
 33 Dean Uthoff vs Geelong 1984
 33 Dean Uthoff vs Adelaide 1984
 33 Kendal Pinder vs Perth 1985
 32 Dean Uthoff vs Coburg 1984
 31 Dan Clausen vs Canberra 1984
 31 Terry Dozier vs Canberra 1992
 30 Kendal Pinder vs Hobart 1985
 30 Mark Ridlen vs Newcastle 1988

Most Rebounds – Team
 84 Sydney vs Hobart 1985
 76 Hobart vs Illawarra 1984
 73 Canberra vs Newcastle 1987
 72 Sydney vs Geelong 1986
 71 Canberra vs Perth 1986
 70 Coburg vs Perth 1982
 69 Canberra vs Melbourne 1984
 69 Sydney vs Newcastle 1988
 69 SE Melbourne vs Newcastle 1992
 68 Adelaide vs St. Kilda 1986

Assists

Most Assists – Individual
 24 Derek Rucker vs Geelong 1994
 20 Casey Jones vs Coburg 1985
 20 Shane Heal vs Adelaide 1990
 20 Robert Rose vs Illawarra 1993
 20 Peter Harvey vs Townsville 1995
 20 Andrew Gaze vs Nth Melbourne 1995
 20 Peter Harvey vs Hobart 1995
 19 Brendan Joyce vs Sydney 1985
 19 Mark Wrightt vs Newcastle 1985
 19 Fred Cofield vs Gold Coast 1995

Most Assists – Team
 51 Coburg vs Devonport 1984
 50 Coburg vs Sydney 1984
 49 Coburg vs West Adelaide 1984
 48 Coburg vs Bankstown 1985
 47 Nunawading vs Devonport 1984
 47 Nunawading vs Illawarra 1985
 46 Coburg vs Illawarra 1984
 45 Melbourne vs St. Kilda 1984
 45 Brisbane vs Melbourne 1990
 45 Illawarra vs Melbourne 1991

Steals

Most Steals – Individual
 11 Phil Smyth vs Sydney 1985
 11 Scott Fenton vs Melbourne 1985
 11 Darryl McDonald vs Newcastle 1994
 11 Steve Woodberry vs Illawarra 1996
 10 Jerry Dennard vs Perth 1987
 10 Ricky Grace vs Canberra 1990
 10 Greg Stokes vs Hobart 1991
 10 Phil Smyth vs Sydney 1992
 9 Steve Lankton vs Canberra 1983

Most Steals – Team
 29 Coburg vs Sydney 1984
 28 Coburg vs Devonport 1984
 27 Sydney vs Melbourne 1985
 26 Nunawading vs Coburg 1985
 25 Perth vs Frankston 1984
 24 Hobart vs St. Kilda 1984
 23 Sydney vs Canberra 1985
 23 Sydney vs Hobart 1985
 23 Hobart vs Perth 1987
 23 Hobart vs Illawarra 1990

Blocks

Most Blocks – Individual
 14 John Dorge vs Nth Melbourne 1991
 12 David Van Dyke vs Illawarra 1996
 12 David Van Dyke vs Adelaide 1997
 11 Darren Rowe vs Eastside 1990
 11 Darren Rowe vs Nth Melbourne 1990
 10 Derick Polk vs Melbourne 1986
 10 Willie Simmons vs Melbourne 1987
 9 Dan Clausen vs Melbourne 1986
 9 Willie Simmons vs Canberra 1987
 9 Simon Dwight vs Townsville 2004

Most Blocks – Team
 18 Perth vs Adelaide 1997
 18 West Sydney vs Townsville 2004
 17 Canberra vs Illawarra 1989
 16 Canberra vs Geelong 1984
 15 Frankstown vs Geelong 1983
 15 Geelong vs Eastside 1990
 15 Geelong vs Hobart 1991
 15 Newcastle vs Adelaide 1995
 15 West Sydney vs Cairns 2004
 14 Geelong vs Nth Melbourne 1990

Field Goals

Highest Field Goal % – Team
 76% Illawarra vs Melbourne 1991
 72% Nunawading vs St. Kilda 1983
 71% West Adelaide vs St. Kilda 1982
 71% St. Kilda vs Frankston 1983
 70% Devonport vs Geelong 1983
 70% Melbourne vs St. Kilda 1984
 68% Sydney vs Adelaide 1996
 67% Illawarra vs Geelong 1983
 67% Perth vs SE Melbourne 1995
 66% Sydney vs West Adelaide 1983

Lowest Field Goal % – Team
 28% Perth vs Sydney 2006
 28% Sydney vs Illawarra 1998
 29% Hunter vs Cairns 2003
 29% Coburg vs Sydney 1982
 29% Nth Melbourne vs SE Melbourne 1994
 30% Devonport vs Brisbane 1984
 30% Perth vs Newcastle 1991
 30% SE Melbourne vs Adelaide 1998
 30% Brisbane vs Canberra 2000
 30% Cairns vs Victoria 2001

Most Field Goals Made – Individual
 26 Al Green vs Sydney 1984
 25 Reg Biddings vs Bankstown 1981
 25 Benny Lewis vs West Adelaide 1984
 25 Al Green vs Frankston 1984
 24 Owen Wells vs Devonport 1984
 24 Al Green vs Coburg 1984
 24 Andrew Gaze vs Newcastle 1987
 24 James Crawford vs Melbourne 1987
 24 Wayne McDaniel vs Adelaide 1989
 23 Peter Blight vs Frankston 1984

Most Field Goals Attempted – Individual
 50 Reg Biddings vs Bankstown 1981
 48 Benny Lewis vs West Adelaide 1984
 45 Al Green vs Coburg 1984
 44 Rocky Smith vs Forrestville 1981
 44 Al Green vs Bankstown 1984
 42 Rocky Smith vs Illawarra 1980
 41 Owen Wells vs Devonport 1984
 41 Al Green vs Frankston 1984
 41 Benny Lewis vs Coburg 1986
 41 Jerry Everett vs Nth Melbourne 1988

3 Point Field Goals

Most Three Pointers Made – Individual
 13 Ian Davies vs St. Kilda 1985
 12 Shane Heal vs Townsville 1994
 12 Shane Heal vs Wollongong 2001
 11 Darryl Pearce vs Newcastle 1988
 11 Brett Maher vs Brisbane 1996
 11 Derek Rucker vs Brisbane 1998
 10 Ebi Ere vs Adelaide 2008
 10 Jason Crowe vs South 2007
 10 Andrew Gaze vs Brisbane 1987
 10 Lanard Copeland vs SE Melbourne 1995
 10 John Rillie vs Perth 2009
 10 Jermaine Beal vs Melbourne 2015
 10 Bryce Cotton vs Cairns 2020

Most Three Pointers Attempted – Individual
 24 Ian Davies vs St. Kilda 1985
 21 Ian Davies vs Geelong 1985
 21 Lanard Copeland vs West Sydney 2002
 19 Brian Goorjian vs West Adelaide 1984
 19 Michael Morrison vs Townsville 1993
 19 Shane Heal vs Perth 1994
 19 Shane Heal vs Townsville 1994
 19 Darren Perry vs Geelong 1995
 19 Shane Heal vs Townsville 1998
 19 Lanard Copeland vs Brisbane 1998

Miscellaneous

Largest Margin
 88 North Melbourne (H) def Sydney 06/05/84
 75 Adelaide (H) def Wollongong 20/07/85
 65 Adelaide def Hobart (H) 13/07/85
 64 Brisbane (H) def Geelong 13/02/88
 64 Perth (H) def Geelong 11/06/88
 64 West Adelaide (H) def Sydney 05/05/84
 63 Geelong def Perth (H) 13/04/84
 63 Townsville (H) def Brisbane 16/03/01
 62 Brisbane def Devonport (H) 03/06/84
 62 Brisbane (H) def Wollongong 22/06/85

Longest Winning Streak
 21 Brisbane 2007
 16 Townsville 2003
 16 Melbourne 1997
 16 Sydney 1983
 16 New Zealand 2013
 15 Geelong 1984
 15 Sydney 2005
 14 Adelaide 1986
 14 St. Kilda 1979
 13 Victoria 2002
 13 Sydney 2022

Longest Losing Streak
 26 Geelong 1988
 21 Cairns 2000
 20 Newcastle 1990
 20 West Sydney 2007
 17 Melbourne 1987
 17 Geelong 1992
 16 West Sydney 2005
 15 Newcastle 1991
 15 Canberra 2001
 15 Hunter 2004
 14 Sydney 2011

Longest Game
 4OT Brisbane (H) def Perth 1994
 4OT Melbourne def Illawarra (H) 2018

Double

Quadruple-double
 25pts, 17rbs, 11ast, 11blk Daren Rowe (Geelong) vs North Melbourne 1990

Attendances

All-time
 18,124 Sydney vs New Zealand 15/03/2023 Grand Final G5 @ Qudos Bank Arena
 18,049 Sydney vs New Zealand 10/03/2023 Grand Final G3 @ Qudos Bank Arena
 17,514 Sydney vs Illawarra               17/11/2019 Round  7    @ Qudos Bank Arena
 17,143 Sydney vs Canberra                02/10/1999 Round  1    @ Sydney Superdome
 17,000 West Sydney vs Brisbane           02/10/1999 Round  1    @ Sydney Superdome
 16,149 Sydney vs Tasmania 11/05/2022 Grand Final G3 @ Qudos Bank Arena
 15,366 South East Melbourne vs Melbourne 22/06/1996 Round 11    @ Rod Laver Arena
 15,129 Melbourne vs South East Melbourne 11/07/1994 Round 14    @ Rod Laver Arena
 15,122 Melbourne vs North Melbourne      23/09/1994 Round 22    @ Rod Laver Arena
 15,099 Melbourne vs Sydney               23/07/1994 Round 16    @ Rod Laver Arena
 15,064 Melbourne vs South East Melbourne 01/11/1996 Grand Final G2 @ Rod Laver Arena
 15,049 Melbourne vs South East Melbourne 24/10/1992 Grand Final G1 @ Rod Laver Arena
 15,034 South East Melbourne vs Melbourne 30/10/1992 Grand Final G2 @ Rod Laver Arena
 15,028 Melbourne vs Perth                23/10/1993 Grand Final G1 @ Rod Laver Arena

Largest home attendances
Current (2022–23 NBL season) teams only. Note, Melbourne United also incorporates the Melbourne Tigers.

 Sydney Kings – 18,124, 15 March 2023 vs New Zealand Breakers @ Qudos Bank Arena
 Melbourne United – 15,129, 11 July 1994 vs South East Melbourne Magic @ National Tennis Centre
 Perth Wildcats – 13,611, 5 March 2017 vs Illawarra Hawks @ RAC Arena
 Brisbane Bullets – 13,221, 26 October 1990, NBL Grand Final game 2 vs Perth Wildcats @ Brisbane Entertainment Centre
 South East Melbourne Phoenix – 10,098, 19 October 2019 vs Illawarra Hawks @ Melbourne Arena
 New Zealand Breakers – 9,330, 7 April 2012, NBL Grand Final game 1 vs Perth Wildcats @ Vector Arena
 Adelaide 36ers – 9,263, 29 December 2022 vs Brisbane Bullets @ Adelaide Entertainment Centre
 Illawarra Hawks – 5,839, 18 February 2005 vs Sydney Kings at WIN Entertainment Centre
 Cairns Taipans – 5,500, 3 March 2004 vs Perth Wildcats @ Cairns Convention Centre
 Tasmania JackJumpers – TBA

See also

List of National Basketball League (Australia) annual scoring leaders

References

External links
 NBL All Time Statistics at aussiehoopla.com
 NBL Top All Time Player Performances
 NBL Single Game Record Performances
 NBL All Time Individual Single Year Averages
 NBL Top Team Performances
 NBL All Time triple-doubles as of February 2021

National Basketball League (Australia)
Australian records
Basketball statistics